Akron Township may refer to the following places in the United States:

Akron Township, Peoria County, Illinois
Akron Township, Michigan
Akron Township, Big Stone County, Minnesota
Akron Township, Wilkin County, Minnesota

Township name disambiguation pages